Ambala is a city and a municipal corporation in Ambala district in the state of Haryana, India, located on the border with the Indian state of Punjab and in proximity to both states capital Chandigarh. Politically, Ambala has two sub-areas: Ambala Cantonment (also known as Ambala Cantt) and Ambala City, eight kilometres apart, therefore it is also known as "Twin City". It has a large Indian Army and Indian Air Force presence within its cantonment area. It is located 200 km (124 mi) to the north of New Delhi, India's capital, and has been identified as a counter-magnet city for the National Capital Region to develop as an alternative center of growth to Delhi.

Ambala separates the Ganges river network from the Indus river network and is surrounded by two rivers – Ghaggar and Tangri – to the north and to the south.

History

Etymology
The town is said to derive its name from Amba Rajput who supposedly founded it during the 14th century CE. According to another version, it is named after the goddess "Bhawani Amba" whose Temple still exists in Ambala city.  The English spelling Umballa has sometimes been used; this spelling was used by Rudyard Kipling in his 1901 novel Kim.

Classical era
Archaeological Surveyor C.J Rodgers found Indo-Parthian Kingdom coins as well as coins of Hunas, Mihirakula and Toramana which indicated that after the disintegration of the Mauryan empire, the area was taken over by Indo-Parthians and later was incorporated in the domain of the Hunas.

Late medieval era
In 1709, Battle of Ambala was fought and Sikhs captured Ambala from Mughals. It was under the rule of Gill Jats in the later medieval era (Sikh Empire).

British colonial era

The Ambala Cantonment

Ambala Army Base 
Ambala Army Cantonment was established in 1843 after the British were forced to leave its Karnal Cantonment following the malaria epidemic of 1841–42 in as there were not any known effective means to control malaria epidemic in those days. The cantonment houses the '2 Corps', one of the three Strike Corps of the Indian Army.

Ambala Air Force Base
Ambala Air Force Base is one of the oldest and largest airbases that were inherited from the British by the IAF. It was from this airbase that Spitfires and Harvards flown by Instructors of the Advanced Flying Training School took part in the Indo-Pakistani War of 1947–1948. Subsequently, Ambala was the front line airfield for many years. It was home to various aircraft that were inducted into the Indian Air Force. Vampires, Ouragans, Hunters, etc. all flew from this base. The airbase was briefly attacked in 1965 by B-57 bombers of the Pakistan Air Force. Today, the Airbase houses the '7 Wing' with squadrons of Jaguars and MiG-21 Bisons. A unit of the French-made Dassault Rafale will also be based at Ambala airbase.

European Cemetery
Ambala Cantonment is the location of historic European Cemetery.

Formation of Ambala district
Ambala was given the status of a district in 1847, formed by the merging of the jagir estates of hitherto independent chieftains whose territories had lapsed or had been confiscated by the British Indian Government. In its 160 years of existence as a district, Ambala has witnessed many changes in its boundaries. Previously, it extended across tehsils of Ambala, Chandigarh, Jagadhri, Pipli, Kharar, Ropar and Nalagarh. Kalka-cum-Kurari State, Pinjore, Mani Majra, Kasauli & Sanawar were also merged later into the district at different times.

1857 rebellion

For their participation in first war of independence, the Chaudharys and Lambardars of villages who participated in rebellion were also deprived of their land and property, including 368 people of Hisar and Gurugram were hanged or transported for life, and fine was imposed on the people of Thanesar (Rs 235,000), Ambala (Rs. 253,541) and Rohtak (Rs. 63,000 mostly on Ranghars, Shaikhs and Muslim Kasai).

Post-independence

Hanging of Nathuram Godse
In November 1949, Mahatma Gandhi's assassin Nathuram Godse was hanged at Ambala Central Jail along with Narayan Apte, a co-conspirator.

Ambala Cantt is also mentioned in the novel Kim by Rudyard Kipling.

Geography

Climate

Demographics

 India census, Ambala UA had a population of 207,934 consisting of 112,840 males and 95,094 females, a ratio of 843. there were 20,687 children 0–6 and Ambala had an average literacy rate of 89.31%, with 91.76% of males and 86.41% of females literate.

Economy

Cloth Market
The Cloth Market is considered to be the largest textile market in this region. It is located in sector 7, the central part of the city of Ambala. The market is known for catering to wedding related shopping. The most commonly bought items are sarees and silk clothing.

Transport
Ambala is connected to all of the other major cities of north India. It is a big interchange for various commuters for all neighbouring states.

National Highway NH 44 popularly known as GT road earlier known as NH 1 passes through Ambala and connects it to National capital Delhi, Panipat, Ludhiana and Amritsar. NH 152 connects it to state capital Chandigarh, Kaithal.
Apart from the Interstate service, Ambala also houses one of the oldest local bus services in Haryana, which is run by both Haryana roadways and private companies. Other means of local transportation include auto rickshaws and cycle rickshaws.

Roadways
Bus service is the major means of public transport in this district. Ambala depot came into being on 1 August 1950. The office of the General Manager has situated on the premises of the depot workshop at Ambala City. Ambala depot has a sub depot at Naraingarh. 

Presently, Haryana Roadways, Ambala has 200 buses, which carry about 34.88 Lac's passengers daily and cover a distance of about 19000 km daily.

Bus stands in this district exist at Ambala City, Naraingarh and Barara as well. A sub-depot-level workshop has also been provided at Naraingarh. 'Yatri Niwas' exists on the campus of Ambala Cantt. bus stand for the convenience of the commuters who wish to stay for the night.

Besides, the Haryana Roadways buses, the government has issued permits to private operators on local routes. Presently 60 such buses are plying in Ambala district.
The bus stand is very near to Ambala Cantt Jn. (Railway station). Most of the buses plying on GT road (NH1) stop in front of the Railway station.

Railways
Ambala is a divisional headquarters of the Northern Railway Zone and is an important railway junction. Ambala Cantt station is among the top 100 booking stations in India. The city is served by three railway stations:
 Ambala Cantt [UMB] (Junction on Delhi-Kalka line and Moradabad-Ambala line/Ambala-Attari line)
 Ambala City [UBC] (On Ambala-Attari line)
 Dhulkot [DKT] (on Delhi-Kalka line)

The Ambala Cantonment railway station was founded on the junction of the Delhi-Kalka and Ludhiana-Saharanpur lines. The historic Delhi-Panipat-Ambala-Kalka railway line dates back to 1889 while the Ludhiana-Saharanpur line was built in 1870.

Ambala cantt railway station is main station of the city and is well connected with major cities of India.
Kalka-Shimla Railway, which is a UNESCO World Heritage site, also comes under Ambala division.

Ambala Cantonment railway station serves maximum Shatabdi Express after New Delhi.
Ambala railway station was mentioned in the famous story 'The Woman on Platform 8' by Ruskin Bond, although in reality there is no platform 8 in Ambala Cantt.

Education
Ambala has a large number of schools and colleges.  Notable colleges are as follows:-

 Convent of Jesus and Mary, Ambala
 E-Max School of Engineering and Applied Research
 Government Polytechnic College, Ambala
 Maharishi Markandeshwar University, Mullana
 Maharishi Markandeshwar University, Sadopur
 Philadelphia Hospital & School of Nursing, Ambala 
 Sanatan Dharma College (S.D. College)
 Shri Atmanand Jain Institute of Management and Technology

Notable people

 Zohrabai Ambalewali
 Hansraj Behl
 Urvashi Butalia
 Simi Chahal
 Juhi Chawla
 Parineeti Chopra
 Swadesh Deepak
 Navneet Kaur Dhillon
 Sanjeev Kapoor
 Manpreet Kaur 
 Nasir Kazmi
 Sucheta Kripalani
 Shalabh Kumar
 Selja Kumari
 Kim Philby
 Ash K. Prakash
 Om Puri
 Saghar Siddiqui 
 Sanjiv Sam Gambhir
 Sushma Swaraj
 Zeba

Notes

References

External links

 
Cities and towns in Ambala district
Ambala district
Haryana